José María García de Andoin Pérez (22 May 1933-4 February 2017) was a Spanish footballer who played as a midfielder, and later was a coach.

References

External links

1933 births
2017 deaths
Sportspeople from the Province of Burgos
Spanish footballers
Footballers from Castile and León
Association football midfielders
Segunda División players
Tercera División players
Deportivo Alavés players
Arenas Club de Getxo footballers
Rayo Vallecano players
CD Izarra footballers
Spanish football managers
CA Osasuna managers
Athletic Bilbao B managers
Real Oviedo managers
Cádiz CF managers
Barakaldo CF managers
Deportivo Alavés managers
RCD Espanyol managers
CD Mirandés managers